Zuriel Smith (born January 15, 1980) is a former American football wide receiver and return specialist in the National Football League (NFL) for the Dallas Cowboys and New England Patriots. He played college football at Hampton University.

Early years
Smith attended Atlee High School in Mechanicsville, Virginia, where he practiced football, track and basketball. He began playing football until his junior year. He was a standout in track, receiving All-state honors three times in the long jump, high jump and triple jump.

He accepted a football scholarship from Hampton University. As a redshirt freshman, he appeared in 10 games, registering 31 receptions (tied for the team lead) for 429 yards, 4 touchdowns and a 13-yard average per punt return. The next year, he led the team with 47 receptions for 816 yards (17.4-yard avg.) and 5 touchdowns. 

As a junior, he registered 58 receptions (led the team) for 732 yards, 6 touchdowns and a 17.7-yard average per punt return, including 4 touchdown returns. He also tied an NCAA Division I-AA record with 3 punt returns for touchdowns in one game (Hampton vs. Virginia State University, September 22, 2001). In that same game, his teammate Terrance Patrick returned 2 kickoffs for touchdowns.

As a senior, he posted 53 receptions (led the team) for 773 yards (14.6-yard avg.), 6 touchdowns and an 18.5-yard average per punt return, including one touchdown return. 

In 2002, he graduated with a BS in Biology, leaving as the school's All-time leader in receptions (189) and punt returns yards (1,145). He also had the record for receptions in a season (58) and in a single-game (13 - Hampton vs. South Carolina State University, 2001).

Professional career

Dallas Cowboys
Smith was selected by the Dallas Cowboys in the sixth round (186th overall) of the 2003 NFL Draft, to upgrade the return game of the special teams units.

In his NFL debut playing on Monday Night Football against the New York Giants on September 15, he returned five kickoffs for 120 yards and also returned four punts. But his best play came with 11 seconds left in the game, after he let a Matt Bryant kickoff roll out of bounds, just inches from the end zone. The penalty gave the Cowboys the ball at their own 40 yard-line with no time off the clock, and allowed them to tie the game and eventually win it in overtime (35-32).

In , he led all NFC rookies in punt return average (7.1 yards), earning Pro Football Weekly's All-rookie honors as a return specialist.

Smith was waived on September 5, . After being out of football for a year, he was re-signed on January  13,  and released on August 17.

New York Giants
On August 18, he was claimed off waivers by the New York Giants and later cut on August 29.

New England Patriots
On February 10, he signed as a free agent with the New England Patriots and was allocated to the Rhein Fire of NFL Europe. He was injured and placed on the NFL Europe reserve list. He was released on February 13, .

References

External links
 New England Patriots bio

1980 births
Living people
People from Richmond, Virginia
Players of American football from Virginia
American football wide receivers
Hampton Pirates football players
Dallas Cowboys players
New England Patriots players
Rhein Fire players